Tehran Bus Rapid Transit was officially inaugurated in 2008 in order to facilitate the motor traffic in Tehran. As at 2011 the bus rapid transit (BRT) system had a network of 100 kilometers which transports 1.8 million passengers on a daily basis.

Routes 
Tehran has currently 10 BRT lines.
Line 1: Azadi Terminal to Tehranpars crossroad (Jan. 2008)
Line 2: Azadi Terminal to Khavaran Terminal
Line 3: Science & Tech Terminal to Khavaran Terminal (Feb. 2009)
Line 4: Tehran South Terminal to Chamran Highway-Parkway Intersection (Afshar Terminal)
Line 5: Science & Tech (Elm-o-san'at Terminal to Argentina Sq. (Beihaghi Terminal)
Line 6: Chamran Highway-Parkway Intersection (Afshar Terminal) to Sohanak (Laleh Terminal)
Line 7: Railway station that is located in southern part of Tehran to Tajrish that is located in northern part of Tehran. (Valiasr Ave.)
Line 8: Tehran South Terminal to Khavaran Terminal
Line 9: Sohanak (Laleh Terminal) to Javanmard Ghassab Metro Station 
Line 10: Azadi Sq. to Daneshgah Azad sq. in Hesarak

Tehran's mayor, Dr. Ghalibaf addressed the inaugural ceremony saying: 
The total length of BRT in Tehran is about 150 km that will be increased to 300 km in future.

See also
Transport in Iran
Trolleybuses in Tehran

References

External links

Bus transport in Iran
Transport in Tehran
2008 establishments in Iran
Bus rapid transit